Victoria is an unincorporated community in Cherokee County, in the U.S. state of Georgia.

History
A post office called Victoria was established in 1899, and remained in operation until 1908. The community most likely was named after Queen Victoria of the United Kingdom.

References

Unincorporated communities in Georgia (U.S. state)
Unincorporated communities in Cherokee County, Georgia